Ruslan Abdrakhmanov (born December 25, 1984) is a Russian professional ice hockey player. He is currently playing with HK Almaty of the Kazakhstan Hockey Championship.

Abdrakhmanov played 10 games in the Kontinental Hockey League with Amur Khabarovsk during the 2008–09 season. He also appeared in 17 games in the Russian Superleague, the top-level Russian league prior to the KHL's foundation, during the 2003–04 and 2004–05 seasons.

References

External links

1984 births
Living people
Amur Khabarovsk players
Salavat Yulaev Ufa players
Russian ice hockey forwards
Sportspeople from Ufa